Lehlogonolo Ronald Mataboge (born March 27, 1997), known professionally as A-Reece, is a South African rapper, songwriter and record producer. He was raised in Pretoria, Gauteng.

A-Reece was under Ambitiouz Entertainment in 2015, but with no paper work signed yet . He gained popularity in 2015 following the release of his single, "Couldn't", which featured the rapper Emtee. After disputes with management of the label, he left to become an independent artist late 2016.

A-Reece released his debut studio album, Paradise (2016) which produced the singles, "Couldn't" and "Mgani". In 2017, A-Reece released his second album From Me to You & Only You. In 2018, he released a collaborative album with Ecco and Wordz titled "Long Lost Letters" (L3), the lead single was "Welcome To My Life". In October that year he released his 5th Extended Play, And I'm Only 21. In 2019, he released Reece Effect.

In 2021, A-Reece signed a distribution deal with Apple Music owned A&R company Platoon, which specializes in packaging emerging artists before they get a major-label contract, and his mixtape Today's Tragedy, Tomorrow's Memory: the mixtape was publicised on Forbes, Clash and Flaunt magazines.

Early life and career 
Lehlogonolo Mataboge was born on the 27th of March 1997 and came from Danville, Pretoria, Gauteng. He started writing music in primary school following the footsteps of his older brother Phologo Jody Mataboge, known as Jay Jody from the hip hop duo B3nchMarQ. He got his stage name "A-Reece" from his star sign Aries.

In 2014, A-Reece released an EP titled Browniez EP. In 2015, A-Reece signed to Ambitiouz Entertainment and released his first single "Couldn't" under the label, featuring Emtee. He released Cutaways, an EP, on 29 September 2016, which consists of songs that did not make the cut for his debut album Paradise. His debut album was later released on October 21, 2016, and topped the No.1 spot on iTunes just under 24 hours after its release. 

Following a financial squabble with Ambitiouz Entertainment, he formed The Wrecking Crew (TWC) in 2017 with Mashbeatz. The Wrecking Crew consisted of MashBeatz, Ex Global, Wordz and other former members, Flvme, Ecco and Mellow. He released a single "Meanwhile in Honeydew" in 2017. On the 21st of October , he released his second album From Me to You & Only You  which included Feelings featuring Flvme. 

In 2018, he released a collaborative album with Ecco and Wordz titled Long Lost Letters (L3), the lead single was Welcome To My Life. Mataboge then released 2 Extended Plays, Gwan Big Up Urself 2 in March and in October he released his 5th EP, And I'm Only 21. In late 2018 Flvme, Ecco and Mellow left The Wrecking Crew due to financial disputes.

In 2019, A-Reece released a single, Carele$$, to address his squabble with Flvme. He then released his second collaborative album with MashBeatz titled Reece Effect. The Wrecking Crew changed names to Rvbberband Records. 

In 2020, A-Reece had a fallout with Mashbeatz and this led to him collaborating with his older brother Jay Jody. He also released a number of singles, including $elfish [Exp.2], which were leading to his highly anticipated mixtape Today's Tragedy, Tomorrow's Memory. 

In 2021, he released his second mixtape Today's Tragedy, Tomorrow's Memory containing 13 tracks. He also released his third collaborative album, heaveN caN waiT: thE narroW dooR, vol.1, with Jay Jody. The album included "the confrontation" which is a song that addresses his beef with his former producer MashBeatz.

Ambitiouz Entertainment controversy
Ambitiouz Entertainment went under much scrutiny after artists Fifi Cooper, B3nchMarQ, A-Reece and Flvme left the label in a very public and ugly fight. Artists claimed that they decided to part ways with the record label because of financial disagreements. Fifi Cooper went on to say that she had been signed for over two years to the label yet had not received a single cent from her performances, as well as royalties. The record label also went on to remove all of A-Reece's music videos from their YouTube channel and his Facebook page was also deleted. A-Reece Released "Loyal" where he addressed his reason for leaving Ambitious Entertainment. In the song A-Reece slammed his former colleague Emtee for staying in the record label. 7 months later on his album Manando, Emtee responded with a diss track called "Crown" calling A-Reece whack and emotional on songs.

Discography

Studio albums

Mixtape

Collaborative albums

Extended plays

Singles

As lead artist

Awards and nominations

References

External links 

1997 births
Living people
South African rappers
South African record producers